Many High School is a high school in Many, Louisiana, United States. It is a part of the Sabine Parish School Board.

History
In the 1930s the school was one of several in northwestern Louisiana that received gymnasiums funded by federal programs.

Athletics
Many High athletics competes in the LHSAA.

Championships
Football championships
(3) State Championships: 2014, 2020, 2022

References

External links
 
 

Schools in Sabine Parish, Louisiana
Public high schools in Louisiana